Fannett is an unincorporated community and census-designated place (CDP) in Jefferson County, Texas, United States. The population was 2,363 at the 2020 census.

The community is named after B. J. Fannett, a local landowner who opened a general store there in the 1890s. When Japanese immigrants brought rice farming to the area, Fannett grew to meet the farmers' needs.

Although oil has been discovered near Fannett, the town's population has remained small.

In 1993 and again in 2004, Fannett was the center of a controversy over the naming of Jap Road (now Boondocks Road). The road had been named in the early 20th century to honor immigrant rice farmer Yoshio Mayumi. However, the meaning of the word "Jap" had changed over time, transforming an honor into an ethnic slur.

Fannett is home to the Clifton Steamboat Museum, which features a large exhibit on Lieutenant Commander Harry Brinkley Bass (after whom the United States Navy destroyer  was named).

Demographics 

As of the 2020 United States census, there were 2,363 people, 871 households, and 588 families residing in the CDP.

Education
In 1961, the Fannett Independent School District was combined with that of neighboring Hamshire, forming the Hamshire-Fannett Independent School District.

Hamshire-Fannett ISD is assigned to Galveston College in Galveston.

References

External links
 
 
 Clifton Steamboat Museum

Beaumont–Port Arthur metropolitan area
Unincorporated communities in Jefferson County, Texas
Unincorporated communities in Texas